The Indian Students' Union and Hostel is a YMCA hostel in Fitzroy Square, Fitzrovia, London. It was founded in 1920 by the Indian National Council of YMCAs to provide housing and social facilities for Indian students in London. Key individuals who assisted were Edwin Bevan, Emily Kinnaird and K. T. Paul, and Laurence Binyon gave the inaugural address.

Ralph Tubbs designed the current building in the early 1950s. iThe building has been listed Grade II on the National Heritage List for England since March 1996.

References

External links

Social institutions
YMCA buildings
Grade II listed buildings in the City of Westminster
Fitzrovia